Zealandia was a New Zealand tabloid newspaper owned, and published weekly for 55 years, by the Catholic Bishop of Auckland. Its first issue is dated 10 May 1934 and its last is dated 23 April 1989. It was founded by the seventh Catholic Bishop of Auckland, James Michael Liston and even though its focus was on Catholic religious matters, well-known New Zealand writers were published in its columns such as James K. Baxter and John Reid. Its editors included Cardinal McKeefry and Bishop Owen Snedden (as they later became), the historian Father Ernest Simmonds, Pat Booth, the newspaper's first lay editor, and the later prominent traditionalist priest, Father Denzil Meuli.

The Catholic Diocese of Auckland holds an archive of publications, including those of its replacement publication New Zealandia.

See also
Roman Catholicism in New Zealand
Peter McKeefry
Denzil Meuli
Owen Snedden

References

Defunct newspapers published in New Zealand
Catholic Church in New Zealand
Publications established in 1934
1934 establishments in New Zealand
Publications disestablished in 1989
1989 disestablishments in New Zealand